Coria is a surname. Notable people with the surname include:

Adrián Coria (football manager) (born 1959), Argentine football manager
Adrián Coria (footballer) (born 1977), Argentine footballer
Enrique Coria, Argentine classical guitarist
Facundo Coria (born 1987), Argentine footballer
Franco Coria (born 1988), Argentine footballer
Gabino Coria Peñaloza (1881–1975), Argentine poet and lyricist
Guillermo Coria (born 1982), Argentine tennis player
Hugo Coria (born 1961), Argentine footballer and manager
Miguel Ángel Coria (born 1937), Spanish classical composer
Rodolfo Coria (born 1959), Argentine paleontologist
Valentin Fernández Coria (1886–1954), Argentine chess player

Spanish-language surnames